Kigazytamakovo (Qıyğaźıtamaq) is a rural locality (a village) in Mishkinsky Selsoviet, Mishkinsky District, Bashkortostan, Russia. The population was 184 as of 2010. There are 7 streets.

Geography 
Kigazytamakovo is located 19 km southwest of Mishkino (the district's administrative centre) by road. Leninskoye is the nearest rural locality.

References 

Rural localities in Mishkinsky District